

See also 2014 in birding and ornithology, main events of 2015 and 2016 in birding and ornithology

The year 2015 in birding and ornithology.

Worldwide

New species
See also Bird species new to science described in the 2010s

Desert owl Strix hadorami 
Perijá tapaculo Scytalopus perijanus 
Sichuan bush warbler Locustella chengi

Taxonomic developments

Ornithologists

Deaths

World listing

Europe

Britain

Breeding birds

Migrant and wintering birds

Rare birds

Other events

Republic of Cyprus
 More than 2 million birds are illegally killed during the autumn, including 800,000 on British military sovereign base areas. They are trapped by limesticks and mist net and served as ambelopoulia in restaurants. The illegal trade is estimated to be worth €15  million per annum.

Ireland

North America
To be completed

South America

Argentina
 A project to reintroduce the red and green macaw (Ara chloropterus), a nationally extinct species, to Ibera National Park was launched by the Rewilding Argentina Foundation.

References

2015
Bird
Birding and ornithology by year